The 2011–12 American Eagles men's basketball team represented American University during the 2011–12 NCAA Division I men's basketball season. The Eagles, led by 12th year head coach Jeff Jones, played their home games at Bender Arena and are members of the Patriot League. They finished the season 20–12, 10–4 in Patriot League play to finish in third place. They lost in the semifinals of the Patriot League Basketball tournament to Lehigh. They were invited to the 2012 CollegeInsider.com Tournament where they lost in the first round to Buffalo.

Roster

Schedule

|-
!colspan=9 style=|Exhibition

|-
!colspan=9 style=|Regular season

|-
!colspan=9 style=| Patriot League tournament

|-
!colspan=9 style=| CollegeInsider.com tournament

References

American Eagles men's basketball seasons
American
American